Hayley Kiyoko Alcroft (born April 3, 1991) is an American singer, dancer and actress. As a child model and actress, she appeared in a variety of films including Scooby-Doo! film series (2009–2010), Lemonade Mouth (2011), Blue Lagoon: The Awakening (2012), Jem and the Holograms (2015), Insidious: Chapter 3 (2015), and XOXO (2016). Alongside her film roles, she also held a recurring role in the TV series The Fosters (2014) and a lead role on CSI: Cyber (2015–2016) and Five Points (2018–2019).

Kiyoko was a founding member of the Stunners in 2007. The group supported Justin Bieber’s My World Tour, before disbanding in 2011. After this, Kiyoko issued three solo extended plays: A Belle to Remember (2013), This Side of Paradise (2015), which includes the single "Girls Like Girls", and Citrine (2016). Following the singles "Sleepover", "Feelings", and "Curious", she released her debut studio album Expectations on March 30, 2018. The album reached the top 20 of the charts in the United States, Canada, and Australia. She has also created a comic book, with the help of Naomi Franquiz and Marla Vazquez, based on her song "Gravel to Tempo". Kiyoko released her fourth extended play I'm Too Sensitive for This Shit on January 14, 2020, and released her second studio album Panorama on July 29, 2022.

Early life
Hayley Kiyoko Alcroft was born on April 3, 1991, in Los Angeles, California, to figure skater and choreographer Sarah Kawahara, and actor and comedian Jamie Alcroft. Her mother is from Canada and is of Japanese ancestry and her father is from Ohio and has English and Scottish ancestry. Kiyoko has two siblings, Alysse and Thatcher.

She began acting at a young age, appearing in national commercials for companies such as GM Onstar, Slim Jim, and Cinnamon Toast Crunch. Insisting on drum lessons at age six, she was writing drum charts for new releases and selling them in a local music store by age 11. At age 8, Kiyoko wrote a song called "Notice", which her father still urges her to release. She was elected student council president of her middle school and high school freshman classes and vice-president in her senior year. She attended Agoura High School and graduated in 2009. She was appointed "Commissioner of Entertainment" in her sophomore year and "Commissioner of Pep Rallies" in her junior year.

She created and choreographed "The Agoura High Step Team" which was faculty-approved as a school club under her direction. The team placed third at a Nationals competition in 2009. Upon graduation, she was accepted into Clive Davis School of Recorded Music at New York University but initially deferred until eventually declining due to career opportunities.

Kiyoko was discovered at the age of five when she went with her friend to a photoshoot. The director asked her to step in front of the camera, and she ended up in a national print ad for KnowledgeWare.

Nickelodeon spotted her at the Culver City Ice Rink, and she ended up featured in and narrating a short piece about children in sports called, "I'm Hayley, a Skater". Kiyoko continued to hone her skills in middle school plays and, in seventh grade, asked for an agent after seeing Eurasian girls like herself act in J. C. Penney commercials. She got her commercial agent and booked her first audition, claiming acting was always just something she did on the side to make money for college and music equipment. Kiyoko started the garage band Hede, named after her grandfather, in November 2007 and released five songs on Myspace and a music video for "Warehouse". The band performed locally on several occasions and split in 2009 after the remaining band members left for college. Her grandfather died in 2011. He was one of the biggest inspirations in Kiyoko's life.

Career

2007–2014: Career beginnings, The Stunners and television films 

In 2007, Kiyoko was approached by former pop-star Vitamin C to join an all-girl singing and dancing group. She joined Allie Gonino, Tinashe, Kelsey Sanders (later replaced by Lauren Hudson), and Marisol Esparza to form the Stunners. Six months after forming, the group signed with Columbia Records and released a single titled "Bubblegum" to iTunes along with the official video for the single. They also contributed a cover of the song "Let's Hear It for the Boy" to the iCarly soundtrack. In 2009, the group left Columbia Records, signed a production deal with Lions gate Entertainment, and shot a music video for their promo single "We Got It", which was released on February 22, 2010. In 2007, Kiyoko starred in her first television role in Unfabulous, being credited as Hayley Alcroft. After graduating high school in 2009, Kiyoko booked her first big movie, starring as Velma Dinkley in Scooby-Doo! The Mystery Begins, a role she almost did not audition for due to her image. In a 2017 interview, she stated she struggles to find acting roles as a biracial woman. The TV movie premiered on September 13, 2009, and was a huge success. It brought in 6.1 million viewers, making it the most-watched program in Cartoon Network's history. She reprised the role in the movie's sequel, Scooby-Doo! Curse of the Lake Monster, which premiered on October 16, 2010. The sequel drew 3.4 million viewers. In 2010, Kiyoko also guest starred in four episodes of Disney's Wizards of Waverly Place in the role of Stevie Nichols, an evil wizard.

The Stunners signed to Universal Republic Records in 2010 and released their first single "Dancin' Around the Truth", which featured the New Boyz. The music video for the song premiered June 2, just before the group was announced as an opening act on Justin Bieber's My World Tour. A full album was planned, but cancelled when the group split in 2011. Kiyoko claimed that she wanted to be in control of her own music. Kiyoko began work on the Disney Channel movie Lemonade Mouth in 2010, starring in a lead role as rebellious teenager Stella Yamada. The film premiered on April 15, 2011, with 5.7 million viewers. Kiyoko later guest starred in the episode "Skater Girl Island" of Disney XD's Zeke and Luther which aired May 23, 2011. A sequel to Lemonade Mouth was cancelled prior to pre-production when Disney released a statement saying that "they felt the movie had completed its story within the first film."

In February 2012, Kiyoko landed a small role in Blue Lagoon: The Awakening, a Lifetime TV movie and remake of the 1980 film The Blue Lagoon. The movie premiered on June 16, 2012. She portrayed the character Gabi in a recurring role on ABC Family's The Fosters and later landed the role of Raven Ramirez in CSI: Cyber. She also portrayed Shannie in the Netflix movie XOXO, which premiered in August 2016.

On March 12, 2013, Kiyoko released her debut EP, A Belle to Remember. The album was partially crowdfunded through MusicPledge. Immediately following its release, Kiyoko began writing new music in London with British producer James Flannigan. She announced via Facebook in 2014 that her next EP was finished and she would be debuting the songs at a show later that month. The songs were recorded in her parents' garage in Los Angeles with Flannigan. Kiyoko also collaborated with Swedish producer Anders Grahn. During this time, Kiyoko was affiliated with Maker Studios, releasing covers of "Jolly Old Saint Nicholas" and medleys of Valentine's Day themed songs on the Maker Music YouTube channel with AJ Rafael.

2015–2018: Record deal, EPs, and Expectations
Her second EP, This Side of Paradise, was released on February 3, 2015. The music video for her single "Girls Like Girls" was released on June 24, 2015. After co-directing the video for "Girls Like Girls" (which as of June 2019 has over 110 million views), Kiyoko assumed full directorial responsibilities for her next music video. "Cliff's Edge" was released via Vevo in November 2015.

After her 25th birthday party, Kiyoko hit her head and suffered a concussion. She was concurrently diagnosed with post-concussion syndrome and depression. In a 2018 interview, Kiyoko said "I couldn't create, and I was like 'If I can't create, what's the point? I have no purpose.'" She started resting with citrine pieces on her forehead and started using a citrine crystal, which inspired the name for her third EP. In 2016, she released the single "Gravel to Tempo" and its music video from her next EP, Citrine. The EP was released on September 30, 2016, via EMPIRE and Atlantic. Her third fully self-directed music video for the song "One Bad Night" was premiered via Vice on October 11, 2016, in order to promote the EP. A new single called "Sleepover" was released alongside its music video on March 2, 2017, via BuzzFeed. Following that, the self-directed music video for her single "Feelings" was released on October 19, 2017. On December 21, 2017, Kiyoko announced her debut studio album, Expectations. The third single, "Curious" was released on January 11, 2018, with the album's pre-order, alongside its music video, directed by Kiyoko and James Larese, and which premiered on Total Request Live. In March, Kiyoko was announced as a supporting act for the first leg of Panic! At the Disco's Pray for the Wicked Tour.

Expectations was released on March 30, 2018. To promote the release of her album, Kiyoko made her live TV debut and performed "Curious" on Jimmy Kimmel Live! on April 3, 2018. Later that month, she announced that she collaborated with Marla Vazquez and Naomi Franquiz to make a comic book based on her song, "Gravel to Tempo." The comic book was sold during the Expectations Tour. Her self-directed music video for "What I Need," featuring Kehlani, was released on May 31, 2018. In June, Kiyoko performed "He'll Never Love You (HNLY)" on Late Night with Seth Meyers. Later in June, Kiyoko was featured in InStyle's first issue of 50 Badass Women for her work alongside notable figures such as Ruth Bader Ginsburg and Emma Watson. On July 26, 2018, Kiyoko was invited by Taylor Swift to perform with her on stage at Gillette Stadium, marking Kiyoko's first stadium performance. The performance video for "What I Need" was released on August 17, 2018. At the 2018 MTV Video Music Awards, Kiyoko won the award for Push Artist of the Year and performed "Curious" on stage.

2019–present: I'm Too Sensitive for This Shit and Panorama
In June 2019, Kiyoko appeared in Taylor Swift's music video for "You Need to Calm Down" with other LGBT celebrities. Kiyoko released her EP I'm Too Sensitive for This Shit on January 14, 2020. It was preceded by singles "I Wish" on July 18, 2019, "Demons" on October 11, "L.O.V.E. Me" on November 15, and "Runaway" on December 13. The track "She" was released as the fifth and final single on the same day as the EP. On June 23, 2021, "Demons" was featured in the third episode of the Disney+ TV series Loki.

On April 30, 2021, Kiyoko released "Found My Friends" as the lead single from her second studio album Panorama, which was released on July 29, 2022. The second single from the album, "Chance", was released on June 1, 2021. On November 17, Kiyoko released a collaboration with Fletcher titled "Cherry". On May 20, 2022, Kiyoko released "For the Girls" as the third single from Panorama.

Personal life

Sexuality and musical influence
Kiyoko is a lesbian. She has stated that she knew she was attracted to girls when she was six years old, coming out to her parents in the sixth grade. Upon realizing she liked girls, she grew up struggling with those feelings, fearing rejection and judgment if she came out. Kiyoko wanted to inspire confidence in young people dealing with the same struggles. Kiyoko's music is focused on her story and emotions she has experienced while coming to terms with her identity. The "This Side of Paradise" music video focuses on her struggles with expressing her true self and the "Gravel to Tempo" music video draws on her experiences with having crushes on girls while growing up. In a 2016 interview, she expressed her frustration about not connecting to people the way she wanted. When Lily May-Young, one of the co-writers for "Girls Like Girls", asked Kiyoko about something about herself that no one knew and she was afraid to sing about, Kiyoko wanted to sing about the fact that she likes girls, but was struggling to be out about that. Tegan and Sara and Katy Perry's "I Kissed a Girl" were Kiyoko's turning point and inspiration to turn to pop music. Through her music, Kiyoko works to normalize lesbian relationships in a society and music industry that she sees as being very heteronormative:

After seeing the impact her music has on her fans, Kiyoko has stated that she regretted not being open about her sexuality sooner. She is now dubbed "Lesbian Jesus" by her fans. Since 2018, Kiyoko has been dating former Bachelor contestant Becca Tilley. The couple initially kept their relationship private and confirmed it in May 2022 after Tilley appeared in Kiyoko's music video "For the Girls", which is inspired by The Bachelor. Prior to this, Tilley used the nickname "95p" to refer to Kiyoko.

Kiyoko's song "Mercy/Gatekeeper" talks about the depression she dealt with after suffering from her concussion.

LGBT advocacy
Since publicly coming out, Kiyoko has been an advocate for LGBT rights and is widely considered to be a gay icon by her fans. who have nicknamed her 'Lesbian Jesus'. Her music videos highlight her own experiences and various LGBT-related issues. The music video for "One Bad Night" raised awareness of violence against transgender women. For Pride Month 2017, Kiyoko partnered with MeUndies to promote their "Celebrate" campaign. Each pair of underwear sold had a portion of the profit donated to the Los Angeles LGBT Center. In 2018, Kiyoko critiqued Rita Ora's song, "Girls", for its depiction of same-sex attraction and harmful implications for the LGBT community. Ora later apologized for the song's implications. After 78 bras were thrown at Kiyoko during the Expectations Tour, she and Neara Russell donated them to I Support The Girls, an organization that supports homeless women, to support homeless LGBT youth. In her acceptance speech for Push Artist of the Year at the 2018 MTV Video Music Awards, Kiyoko dedicated her win to queer women of color. She marched in a Pride parade for the first time, attending the 2019 World Pride Parade in New York City as the float ambassador for W Hotels Worldwide.

Politics
In 2016, she supported Hillary Clinton and expressed dismay at Donald Trump winning the U.S. Presidential Election. In 2018, Kiyoko was praised by HeadCount for helping her fans register to vote while she was supporting Panic! at the Disco's Pray for the Wicked Tour. She endorsed Joe Biden for the 2020 United States presidential election in a tweet following Biden's announcement Kamala Harris would be his running mate.

Filmography

Film

Television

Web

Discography

 Expectations (2018)
 Panorama (2022)

Concert tours
Headlining
 This Side of Paradise Tour (2015)
 The Summer Tour (2015)
 One Bad Night Tour (2016–2017)
 Expectations Tour (2018–2019)
 The Panorama Tour (2023)

Opening act
 Never Shout Never – Mid Winter's Nights Dream Acoustik Tour (2015)
 Miike Snow – III Tour (2016)
 Bridgit Mendler – Nemesis Tour (2016)
 Panic! at the Disco – Pray for the Wicked Tour (2018)
 Lauv – The All 4 Nothing Tour (2022)

Awards and nominations
During her career, Kiyoko has been nominated for the following awards for her work as an actress, musical artist, and her presence in the LGBT community. In 2015, she won the Jury Award for her role as Alisa in Hello, My Name is Frank. In 2018, she won a MTV Video Music Award for Push Artist of the Year.

See also
 Honorific nicknames in popular music

References

External links

 
 
 

1991 births
Living people
Actresses from Los Angeles
American actresses of Japanese descent
American film actors of Asian descent
American child actresses
American child singers
American female dancers
American women pop singers
American women singer-songwriters
American film actresses
American multi-instrumentalists
American music video directors
American people of English descent
American people of Scottish descent
American musicians of Japanese descent
Atlantic Records artists
American synth-pop musicians
American television actresses
American women guitarists
American women in electronic music
American women musicians of Japanese descent
Dancers from California
Female music video directors
American lesbian actresses
American lesbian musicians
American LGBT people of Asian descent
Lesbian dancers
Lesbian singers
Lesbian songwriters
LGBT directors
LGBT people from California
American LGBT rights activists
American LGBT singers
American LGBT songwriters
Maker Studios people
Musicians from Los Angeles
Singer-songwriters from California
21st-century American actresses
21st-century American women singers
20th-century LGBT people
21st-century LGBT people